Richard Allen Severson (January 18, 1945 – January 19, 2016) was a Major League Baseball shortstop who played for two seasons. He played in 77 games for the Kansas City Royals during the 1970 season and 16 games during the 1971 season.

External links

1945 births
2016 deaths
Baseball players from California
Major League Baseball shortstops
Kansas City Royals players
Sarasota Sun Sox players
Lynchburg White Sox players
Appleton Foxes players
Eugene Emeralds players
Omaha Royals players
Clinton C-Sox players